Sé is an album by Lúnasa. It was released in 2006 on Compass Records, and is the band's sixth major release. The album's name means 'six' in Irish.

Tracks like 'Black River' and 'Boy in the Boat', including Iain Kirkpatrick's great reel 'The Boys of Ballivanich', are familiar from recent concert tours, and all the more welcome for that."

Track listing
 The Cullybacky Hop(Mike Hobin's, Emmett's Hedgehog, Dunrobin Castle)
 Leckan Mór(Kalyana, Emer Maycock, Above in the Garret, Leckan Mór)
 Absent Friends(Absent Friends, Ivory Lady)
 Loophead(Bolton St., The Millstream, Loophead Lighthouse)
 Midnight in Avilés(N'Alcordanza, Soig's Plinn, Skolvan Doubl Plinn)
 The Dingle Berries(The Hop, Padraig O'Keefe's, Nessa The Mover, Trip To Dingle)
 Black River(Across the Black River, Iain MacDonald's)
 Road to Barga(Timmy Collins', Road to Barga)
 Two of a Kind(Showacho, Portobello)
 Glentrasna
 Boy in the Boat(The Ballivanich, The Boy In The Boat, The Stone Of Destiny)

References

External links
 Lúnasa's website

2006 albums
Lúnasa (band) albums